A Night of Thrills is a 1914 American silent supernatural drama film directed by Joe De Grasse, written by Ida May Park (uncredited)
(who was De Grasse's wife) and featuring Lon Chaney and Pauline Bush. The film is now considered to be lost. Some sources say this film may never have actually been released at all, since not a single review of the film has ever turned up anywhere, but the Blake book claims it was released theatrically on Dec. 13, 1914.

Plot
Howard Wild, a kindly old gentleman, bequeaths his old mansion to his young niece Hazel and her fiancé Jack as a wedding present. A few days before the wedding, Hazel hears some terrible gossip about Jack, and after a spat, she leaves him and flees to the mansion to be alone. That night some thieves arrive to rob the house and Hazel watches them, helpless and terrified. When the criminals go down into the wine cellar, she runs for the door, but just then Jack enters and, mistaking him for another burglar in the dark, she screams and faints. Hearing her scream, The burglars run from the house, thinking the place is haunted, and leave the loot behind. Jack revives Hazel, but she still refuses to make up with him. Suddenly the ghost of old Uncle Howard appears before them and acts as a peacemaker, reuniting them again. The two lovebirds return home to be married.

Cast
 Pauline Bush as Hazel
 William C. Dowlan as Jack
 Charles Manley as Uncle Howard Wild (the ghost)
 Lon Chaney credited as "The Visitor"

References

External links

1914 films
1914 short films
American silent short films
American black-and-white films
1914 drama films
Lost American films
Films directed by Joseph De Grasse
Universal Pictures short films
Silent American drama films
1914 lost films
Lost drama films
1910s American films